The Central PA Vipers were a team of the Independent Women's Football League.  Based in the Steelton suburb of Harrisburg, Pennsylvania, the Vipers played their home games at Steelton-Highspire School District's War Veterans Memorial Field, also known as Cottage Hill. Prior to playing in the IWFL, the Vipers were a member of the National Women's Football Association in 2006 and 2007 (in their inaugural season, they were called the Harrisburg Angels).

After four seasons and twenty-seven attempts (not counting two forfeits by the Richmond Spirit in 2007), the Vipers finally picked up their first victory on the gridiron on June 6, 2009 thanks to a 48-0 triumph over the Holyoke Hurricanes.  The following week, the Vipers continued their string of success, defeating the Cape Fear Thunder, 30-6.

Season-By-Season 

|-
| colspan="6" align="center" | Harrisburg Angels (NWFA)
|-
|2006 || 0 || 8 || 0 || 4th Northern North Atlantic || --
|-
| colspan="6" align="center" | Central PA Vipers (NWFA)
|-
|2007 || 2 || 7 || 0 || 4th Northern Central || --
|-
| colspan="6" align="center" | Central PA Vipers (IWFL)
|-
|2008 || 0 || 8 || 0 || 6th Eastern North Atlantic || 
|-
|2009 || 2 || 6 || 0 || 18th IWFL2 || --
|-
!Totals || 4 || 29 || 0
|colspan="2"| (including playoffs)

2009 Season Schedule

** = Forfeited

References

Central PA Vipers official website

Independent Women's Football League
Sports in Harrisburg, Pennsylvania
Women's sports in Pennsylvania